LS Mtron Co., Ltd. is a  South Korean heavy machinery and electronic components manufacturer company headquartered in Anyang, Gyeonggi, South Korea. Its products include tractors, injection molding machines, and electronic components. LS Mtron is a member of LS Group, which was spun off from LG Group in 2003.

History
In 1977, KHIC (Korea Heavy Industries & Construction Co.) begins the production of tractors in collaboration with Fiat at the Gunpo plant. In 1983, Goldstar Heavy Industries (LS Mtron) acquired KHIC's agricultural machinery division. Currently, LS Mtron has 4 factories in South Korea, Brazil, China and U.S.

External links
 LS Tractors Official Facebook Page (English)
 LS Tractors Official Korea Facebook Page (Korean)

References

Tractor manufacturers of South Korea
South Korean brands